Wah Kaba Falls is a waterfall located near Cherrapunji in Meghalaya, in the north eastern India. The waterfall descends from a steep rockface and drops approximately 170–190 metres into a gorge. There is a local legend that two fairies live at the falls. The falls can be seen on the way to Cherrapunji from Shillong.

Gallery

References

External links
TripAdvisor

Waterfalls of Meghalaya